Q3 Academy is the name of three secondary schools located in the West Midlands of England:

Q3 Academy Great Barr
Q3 Academy Langley
Q3 Academy Tipton

See also
Q3 (disambiguation)